The 2020 Mugello FIA Formula 3 round was a motor racing event held on 12 and 13 September 2020 at the Mugello Circuit in Tuscany, Italy. It was the final round of the 2020 FIA Formula 3 Championship, and ran in support of the 2020 Tuscan Grand Prix. Oscar Piastri would be crowned champion after Logan Sargeant collided with Lirim Zendeli in Race 2, and Theo Pourchaire failed to outscore him.

Entries 
With Pierre-Louis Chovet returning to Formula Regional, Hitech Grand Prix tried to poach Igor Fraga to race for them in the final round. However, Fraga's team Charouz Racing System blocked the move, and both teams raced with only two cars that weekend, those of Liam Lawson and Dennis Hauger, and Michael Belov and Roman Staněk respectively.

Classification

Qualifying 
The Qualifying session took place on 11 September 2020, with Lirim Zendeli achieving his second pole position of the year.

 Notes：

  - Dennis Hauger and Michael Belov were handed three-place grid drops each for impeding Clément Novalak and Cameron Das respectively.
  - Logan Sargeant was handed a three-place grid drop for causing a collision with Frederik Vesti at the previous race.
 - Clément Novalak was handed a five-place grid drop for causing a collision with Michael Belov and Oscar Piastri at the previous race.
 - Oscar Piastri was handed a five-place grid drop for forcing David Beckmann off the track at the previous race.

Feature Race

Sprint Race

Final Championship standings 

Drivers' Championship standings

Teams' Championship standings

 Note: Only the top five positions are included for both sets of standings.
 Note: Bold names include the Drivers' and Teams' Champion respectively.

See also 

 2020 Tuscan Grand Prix
 2020 Mugello Formula 2 round

Notes

References

External links 
Official website

|- style="text-align:center"
|width="35%"|Previous race:
|width="30%"|FIA Formula 3 Championship2020 season
|width="40%"|Next race:

Mugello
Formula 3 Mugello